The Castor River is divided into the Upper Castor River and the Lower Castor River by the Headwater Diversion Channel.

The Upper Castor rises in the southern corner of Ste. Genevieve County of southeast Missouri about ten miles north-northeast of Fredericktown. The river flows south through eastern Madison County into the eastern edge of Wayne County to Bollinger County where it empties into the Headwater Diversion Channel, which flows into the Mississippi River just south of Cape Girardeau.

The Lower Castor River south of the Diversion Channel flows south where it joins the Little River.

Castor is a name derived from French meaning "beaver". The stream was mentioned by Henry Schoolcraft in his 1818 report on his exploration of southern Missouri.

See also
List of Missouri rivers

References

Rivers of Missouri
Rivers of Ste. Genevieve County, Missouri
Rivers of St. Francois County, Missouri
Rivers of Bollinger County, Missouri
Rivers of Wayne County, Missouri
Rivers of Madison County, Missouri
Rivers of Cape Girardeau County, Missouri